Chung Hwa Medical Institution is a medical institution located in Toa Payoh, Singapore. The institution is the headquarters of the Singapore Chinese Physicians Association (SCPA), and houses the Singapore College of Traditional Chinese Medicine, the Chinese Medical and Drugs Research Institute, Chinese Acupuncture Research Institution, and a traditional Chinese medicine clinic.

History
Originally known as the Chung Hwa Free Hospital, the medical institution was established on 28 October 1978 as a branch of the Chung Hwa Free Clinic along Telok Ayer Street. The construction of the medical institution was funded by the donations of the public during a fundraising campaign held in 1972, with contributions coming not only wealthy donors but also common folk, including over 5,700 taxi drivers and 500 trishaw riders. The institution offered free medicine and herbs under a free clinic operating model, requiring only a nominal 50 cent registration fee. On the opening day, the institution saw over 400 patients seeking treatment. In 1979, an acupuncture exhibition took place in the institution. In 1980, the institution began utilising fusion approaches, combining traditional treatments with modern technology, such as the use of X-rays for diagnosis.

The medical institution has been included in the Toa Payoh Heritage Trail by the National Heritage Board.

References

Buildings and structures in Singapore
1978 establishments in Singapore